Mark Keil and Dave Randall were the defending champions.

Keil and Randall successfully defended their title, defeating Luke Jensen and Sandon Stolle 7–5, 6–4 in the final.

Seeds

Draw

Draw

References

External links
 Main draw

Tennis Channel Open
1993 ATP Tour
1993 Tennis Channel Open